The California Genealogical Society (CGS) is a genealogical institution, the oldest and largest in California. Founded in 1898, its mission is to aid Californians in tracing family history, through its research services, educational resources, online tools, and genealogical databases. 

The CGS Research Library, one of the largest on the West Coast, contains over 38,000 reference materials from California and around the world.

History
The California Genealogical Society was founded on February 12, 1898, in San Francisco. The society moved from San Francisco to Oakland in 1997.

The society's original library was devastated by the 1906 San Francisco earthquake. By 1913, the society had rebuilt its collection, growing to one of the largest in the West Coast.

Between 1913 and 1962, the society's library and collections were housed at various sites in San Francisco, including the San Francisco War Memorial and Performing Arts Center and the San Francisco Public Library.

From 1962 to 1982, the society had an agreement with the California Historical Society to house the CGS collections at the archives of the California Historical Society.

Since 2007, the society, its research library, and collections have all been housed in the historic Breuner Building in Oakland.

Resources
The CGS website features The California Names Index, a free, searchable database containing more than 350,000 names from state, county, and local references found in the library. It is an ongoing project and names are added regularly.

The society regularly hosts seminars, genealogical workshops, and members meetings on subjects pertaining to genealogy and the history of prominent Californian figures and families.

CGS is a member of the Federation of Genealogical Societies.

References

External links
 Official website
 Official blog
 Official account on Twitter
 Official account on YouTube
 California Genealogical Society Library Catalog

Genealogical societies in the United States
Genealogical libraries in the United States
Libraries in California
1898 establishments in California
Clubs and societies in California
Special collections libraries in the United States